Vittorio Scatola (born 25 January 1959) is an Italian motorcycle racer. He raced in Grand Prix racing between 1986 and 1994, scoring a single point at the Nations Grand Prix in 1989.

Career statistics

Grand Prix motorcycle racing

Races by year
(key) (Races in bold indicate pole position) (Races in italics indicate fastest lap)

Superbike World Championship

Races by year
(key) (Races in bold indicate pole position) (Races in italics indicate fastest lap)

References

External links
Vittorio Scatola – Profile at the official MotoGP website

Living people
1959 births
Italian motorcycle racers
500cc World Championship riders
Superbike World Championship riders